Patrick Ochan may refer to:
 Patrick Ochan (cricketer)
 Patrick Ochan (footballer)